Complejo deportivo de Bayaguana is a soccer stadium in Monte Plata, Dominican Republic.  It is currently used for football matches and hosts the home games of Delfines Del Este of the Liga Dominicana de Fútbol.  The stadium holds 1,800 spectators.

External links
http://www.balompiedominicano.com/2015/03/estadios-llenos-en-la-primera-jornada.html
http://ldf.com.do

Buildings and structures in Monte Plata Province
Football venues in the Dominican Republic